{{DISPLAYTITLE:C13H19N}}
The molecular formula C13H19N (molar mass: 189.30 g/mol, exact mass: 189.1517 u) may refer to:

 AC927 (phenethylpiperidine)
 6-APT (6-(2-aminopropyl)tetralin)
 5-MAPDI (indanylmethylaminopropane)

Molecular formulas